The 2010-11 Serie A was the 44th edition of the premier category of the Italian women's football championship. It was won by defending champion Torres, which won all matches except for a tie against Brescia. With this trophy Torres reached Lazio, which narrowly avoided relegation, as the most successful team in the Serie A with five titles. UPC Tavagnacco was the championship's runner-up for the first time, also qualifying for the 2011-12 Champions League.

The competition was expanded from twelve to fourteen teams for this season, with Firenze, Mozzanica, Orlandia 97 and Südtirol Vintl replacing Atalanta and ASD Fiammamonza 1970 and joining Bardolino, Brescia, Chiasiellis, Lazio, Reggiana, Roma, Tavagnacco, Torino, Torres and Venezia 1984. Südtirol and Orlandia were relegated.

League table

Results

Top scorers

References

2010-11
Italy
Women Serie A
1